Richard Ogden may refer to:
 Richard Ogden (jeweller), British jeweller
 Richard C. Ogden, American attorney and district judge